Eric M. Rogers (15 August 1902 – 1 July 1990) was a British writer and physics educator. He wrote the 1960 textbook Physics for the Inquiring Mind. The book, subtitled The Methods, Nature, and Philosophy of Physical Science, was based on courses he gave at Princeton University, where he taught from 1942 to 1971. Rogers also headed the Nuffield Science Teaching Project programme in physics education in the 1960s.

Life and work 

Eric Rogers was born on 15 August 1902 at Bickley, Kent. His father, Charles Knight Rogers was a publisher for the International News Co. Ltd. Eric went to Bedales School from 1916 to 1921. Bedales school and its founder John Haden Badley had a strong influence on him, and during his last year at the school he was elected as the Head Boy, and Editor of the school magazine.

Rogers went to Trinity College, Cambridge gaining first class honours both in Mathematics Tripos Part 1 in 1922 and Natural Science Tripos Part 2 in 1924. He was elected a senior scholar in 1923. He did a short term of research and teaching in the Cavendish Laboratory from 1924 to 1925, which ended in his posting as physics master and assistant house master at Clifton College, Bristol. He remained there from 1925 to 1928.

In 1928 Rogers joined Bedales school a physics teacher and boys' house-master. Here he met Janet Drummond, a history teacher. They became engaged in April 1930, and eloped before the term ended to get married on 14 June 1930. After this, Rogers became an instructor in physics at Harvard University for two years. He returned to England in 1932 and joined Charterhouse School as physics master, until 1937.

In 1937 he went back to USA to join the Putney School for three years. He was then appointed at Mount Holyoke College (1940–41) and St Paul's, Concord (1941–42). In 1942 he joined Princeton University as associate professor. He retired as professor from Princeton University in 1971.

Rogers was also a member of the Physical Sciences Study Committee (PSSC). In 1962 he became a consultant on the Nuffield O-Level physics project, and he became the organizer of the project in 1963. He had a considerable impact on the project.

Rogers' wife and sister died in 1971 and 1972 respectively, which disrupted his retirement plans. Eric Rogers died on 1 July 1990 in Cambridge.

Wonder and Delight, published in 1994 (Institute of Physics), is a book dedicated to Rogers's works and philosophy. The book's subtitle is Essays in Science Education in honour of the life and work of Eric Rogers (1902–1990). A biography of Rogers was included.

Awards

In 1969 Rogers received the Oersted Medal, which is given by the American Association of Physics Teachers.
In 1980 he became the inaugural recipient of the Physics Education Medal, awarded by the International Commission on Physics Education, and in 1985 he was given the Lawrence Bragg Medal of the Institute of Physics. 
He was a fellow of the Institute of Physics, the American Physical Society, and a member of the European Physical Society.

Films 
 Physical Science Study Committee (PSSC) film.

References

1902 births
1990 deaths
English physicists
People educated at Bedales School
People from Bickley
Alumni of Trinity College, Cambridge